A list of mathematicians, past and present, with associations with the University of Cambridge.

A - F
Rediet Abebe, graduate student at Pembroke College, Cambridge
Frank Adams, fellow of Trinity College, Cambridge, Lowndean Professor of Astronomy and Geometry 1970-1989
John Couch Adams, fellow of St. John's College, Cambridge 1843–1852; fellow of Pembroke College, Cambridge 1853–1892; Lowndean Professor of Astronomy and Geometry 1859-1891
Michael Atiyah, fellow of Trinity College, Cambridge 1954–1957; fellow of Pembroke College, Cambridge 1958–1961; Master of Trinity College, Cambridge 1990-1997
Charles Babbage, Lucasian Professor of Mathematics 1828-1839
Christopher Budd, Gresham Professor of Geometry, student at St John's College 1979-1983
Alan Baker, fellow of Trinity College, Cambridge 1964-
H. F. Baker, fellow of St. John's College, Cambridge
Dennis Barden, fellow of Pembroke College, Cambridge
Isaac Barrow, fellow of Trinity College, Cambridge 1649–1655, Lucasian Professor of Mathematics
Bryan John Birch, undergraduate and research student at Trinity College, Cambridge, fellow of Churchill College, Cambridge
Béla Bollobás, fellow of Trinity College, Cambridge
Richard Ewen Borcherds
Henry Briggs, Fellow of St. John's College, Cambridge
Dame Mary Cartwright, fellow and Mistress of Girton College, Cambridge
J. W. S. Cassels, fellow of Trinity College, Cambridge 1949–1984; Sadleirian Professor of Pure Mathematics 1967-1986
Arthur Cayley, student at Trinity College, Cambridge
D. G. Champernowne
Sydney Chapman, student at and later lecturer and fellow (1914–1919) of Trinity College, Cambridge
William Kingdon Clifford
John Coates, fellow of Emmanuel College, Cambridge 1975–1977; Sadleirian Professor of Pure Mathematics 1986–2012
John Horton Conway, fellow of Sidney Sussex College, Cambridge 1964–1970; fellow of Gonville and Caius College, Cambridge 1970-1986
Roger Cotes
Percy John Daniell
Philip Dawid
Harold Davenport
James Davenport, undergraduate and research student at Trinity College, Cambridge
Rollo Davidson, undergraduate and research fellow of Trinity College, Cambridge 1962–1970, fellow-elect of Churchill College, Cambridge
Augustus De Morgan
Paul Dirac, fellow of St. John's College, Cambridge 1927–1969; Lucasian Professor of Mathematics 1932-1969
Simon Donaldson, undergraduate at Pembroke College, Cambridge 1976-1979
Arthur Stanley Eddington
Andrew Forsyth, fellow of Trinity College, Cambridge; Sadleirian Professor of Pure Mathematics

G - M
Anil Kumar Gain, Fellow of the Royal Statistical Society
James Glaisher
Peter Goddard, Master of St John's College, Cambridge 1994-2004
William Timothy Gowers, fellow of Trinity College, Cambridge ?- ; Rouse Ball Professor of Mathematics 1998-
Geoffrey Grimmett, fellow of Churchill College, Cambridge, Professor of Mathematical Statistics 1992-
Ian Grojnowski, faculty member of DPMMS, 1999-
G. H. Hardy, fellow of Trinity College, Cambridge 1900–1919, 1931–1942; Sadleirian Professor of Pure Mathematics 1931-1942
Stephen Hawking, fellow of Gonville and Caius College, Cambridge 1966–2018; Lucasian Professor of Mathematics 1979-2009
Nigel Hitchin, fellow of Gonville and Caius College, Cambridge, Rouse Ball Professor of Mathematics 1994-1997
E. W. Hobson
James Jeans
Harold Jeffreys, fellow of St John's College, Cambridge 1914–1989; Plumian Professor of Astronomy 1946-1958
Vinod Johri, Commonwealth fellow for post-doctorate work at Department of Applied Mathematics and Theoretical Physics, Cambridge University, 1967-1968
Thomas Jones, mathematician, fellow of Trinity College, Cambridge
Richard Jozsa, holder of the Leigh Trapnell Chair in Quantum Physics
Frank Kelly, fellow 1976-2006 and master 2006- of Christ's College, professor of the Mathematics of Systems
David George Kendall, fellow of Churchill College, Cambridge, Professor of Mathematical Statistics 1962-1985
John Maynard Keynes, B.A. in mathematics 
Joshua King, Lucasian Professor of Mathematics, President of Queens' College, Cambridge
Frances Kirwan
Thomas William Körner, fellow of Trinity Hall, Cambridge
Peter Landrock, senior member of the Wolfson College, Cambridge, 1997-
Joseph Larmor, Lucasian Professor of Mathematics
Imre Leader, fellow of Trinity College, Cambridge
John Edensor Littlewood, fellow of Trinity College, Cambridge 1908–1977; Rouse Ball Professor of Mathematics 1928-1950
Sir Donald MacAlister, fellow of St John's College, Cambridge
Ian G. Macdonald, graduate of Trinity College, Cambridge
James Clerk Maxwell, Cavendish Professor of Physics 1871-1879
Isaac Milner, Lucasian Professor of Mathematics, President of Queens' College, Cambridge

N - S
Crispin St. J. A. Nash-Williams
Max Newman, fellow of St John's College, Cambridge
Isaac Newton, fellow of Trinity College, Cambridge 1667–1701; Lucasian Professor of Mathematics 1669-1702
Richard Nickl, fellow of Queens' College, Cambridge, Professor of Mathematical Statistics
James R. Norris, fellow of Churchill College, Cambridge
Simon P. Norton, undergraduate and research student at Trinity College, Cambridge
William McFadden Orr, fellow of St John's College, Cambridge
Roger Penrose, graduate student at St John's College, Cambridge ?-1958; research fellow at St John's College, Cambridge 1958-1961
Srinivasa Ramanujan, fellow of Trinity College, Cambridge 1918-1920
Frank P. Ramsey, student of Trinity College, Cambridge and fellow of King's College, Cambridge
CR Rao, statistician and former PhD student under Ronald Fisher
Chris Rogers
Bertrand Russell, fellow of Trinity College, Cambridge
Richard Samworth, fellow of St John's College, Cambridge, Professor of Statistics
Graeme Segal, fellow of St John's College, Cambridge, Lowndean Professor of Astronomy and Geometry, 1990–1999
Nicholas Shepherd-Barron, fellow of Trinity College, Cambridge
David Spiegelhalter, fellow of Churchill College, Cambridge, Winton Professor of the Public Understanding of Risk 2007-
Sir George Gabriel Stokes, fellow then Master of Pembroke College, Cambridge, Lucasian Professor of Mathematics
Peter Swinnerton-Dyer, fellow of Trinity College, Cambridge, master of St Catharine's College, Cambridge
James Joseph Sylvester, undergraduate at St John's College, Cambridge 1831-1837

T - Z
G. I. Taylor, fellow of Trinity College, Cambridge
Martin J. Taylor, fellow of Trinity College, Cambridge
Richard Taylor, fellow of Clare College, Cambridge
John G. Thompson, fellow of Churchill College, Cambridge; Rouse Ball Professor of Mathematics 1971-1993
Alan Turing, fellow of King's College, Cambridge 1935-1945
W. T. Tutte, undergraduate and research student at Trinity College, Cambridge 1935-1941
John Venn, fellow of Gonville and Caius College, Cambridge
C. T. C. Wall, graduate of Trinity College, Cambridge
John Wallis, fellow of Queens' College, Cambridge 1644-1645
Richard Weber, fellow of Queens' College, Cambridge, Churchill Professor of Mathematics for Operational Research 1994-
Alfred North Whitehead
E. T. Whittaker graduate and fellow of Trinity College, Cambridge from 1882 to 1906
Peter Whittle, fellow of Churchill College, Cambridge, Churchill Professor of Mathematics for Operational Research 1967-1994
Andrew Wiles, research student and then junior research fellow at Clare College, Cambridge 1975-1980
David Williams, professor of mathematical statistics 1985-1992
Shaun Wylie, fellow of Trinity Hall, Cambridge
Erik Christopher Zeeman, fellow of Gonville and Caius College, Cambridge, honorary fellow of Christ's College, Cambridge

See also 
List of mathematicians
Faculty of Mathematics, University of Cambridge
Lucasian Chair
Sadleirian Chair
Rouse Ball Professor of Mathematics
Lowndean Professor of Astronomy and Geometry
Churchill Professorship of Mathematics for Operational Research
Professorship of Mathematical Statistics, University of Cambridge
List of Wranglers of the University of Cambridge

 
Lists of mathematicians
Mathematicians
Mathematics education in the United Kingdom